Omega Doom is a 1996 American science fiction action film directed by Albert Pyun and starring Rutger Hauer. It was written by Pyun and Ed Naha. The story, set in a dystopian future, concerns a robot warrior who, during a nuclear winter, plays both sides of a robot civil war in a small town. The film is mostly based on Yojimbo by Akira Kurosawa. It is considered a cult film.

Plot 

At the end of a World War between humans and robots, a nuclear bomb was detonated and a Dark Age begun, without technology or electricity. On the last day of the war, as the nuclear bombs are detonating, one of the robots, Omega Doom, is shot in his head by a dying soldier. The shot causes Doom's programming for the destruction of mankind to be erased. After the world was cleared of humanity by the cyborgs, only the cyborgs and robots remain. Some time later, Omega Doom arrives at a destroyed city, where he encounters an unusual community of robots and roms (newer and more advanced robots), who are in conflict.

At the city Omega Doom finds there are two remaining peaceful robots - a former nanny who now works as a bartender and the head of a former teacher, whom the other robots use as a ball. Omega Doom helps The Head find a body and tells Doom about a rumored stock of hidden weapons. Both the robots and the roms want these weapons in order to continue the destruction of the remaining humans.

Eventually, Omega Doom gets the robots to promise to destroy the roms in exchange for half of the weapons; but he also proposes the same deal to the roms. The robots and the roms end up fighting each other, ensuring their mutual destruction. Afterwards, Doom leaves the last two peaceful robots (The Bartender and The Head) and the one remaining rom in charge of the city and continues his wandering.

Cast 

 Rutger Hauer as Omega Doom
 Anna Katarina as The Bartender
 Norbert Weisser as The Head
 Shannon Whirry as Zed, Droid Leader
 Simon Poland as Zed Too, Droid
 Jahi Zuri as Marko, Droid
 Earl White as Titus, Droid
 Tina Coté as Blackheart, Rom Leader
 Jill Pierce as Zinc, Rom
 Cynthia Ireland as Ironface, Rom
 Jozef Apolen as The Scientist

Production 
Christopher Lambert was considered for the lead role before Rutger Hauer was cast.

The screenplay written by Albert Pyun and Ed Naha was originally set in Paris, at EuroDisney. The characters were supposed to be an animatronic theme park's figures who continue to operate after a global catastrophe. Each "Zone" was the domain of the animatronic characters who were part of that same zone's theme. Omega Doom was originally built to be part of a new exhibit at EuroDisney established around the Terminator franchise and the entire setting was within the theme park.

Reception

Critical response
TV Guide rated it 1/4 stars and wrote that "Omega Doom is merely an exercise in reviving moldy sci-fi cliches from their familiar genre graves". Keith Bailey of the Radio Times rated it 1/5 stars and called the film's action sequences "so poorly directed as to be incomprehensible". Nathan Rabin of The A.V. Club wrote: "In addition to being incompetently written and directed, Omega Doom is also laughably pretentious".

References

External links 
 
 

1996 films
1990s science fiction action films
American robot films
American science fiction action films
Apocalyptic films
American post-apocalyptic films
Films directed by Albert Pyun
Largo Entertainment films
Cyborg (film series)
1990s English-language films
1990s American films